The name Picentes or Picentini refers to the population of Picenum, on the northern Adriatic coastal plain of ancient Italy. Their endonym, if any, is not known for certain. There is linguistic evidence that the Picentini comprised two different ethnicities:  a group known to scholars as the "South Picenes" (or South Picenians) were an Italic tribe, while the "North Picenes" (or North Picenians) appear to have had closer links to non-Italic peoples.

Usage of the toponym Picenum depends on the time period. The region between the Apennines and the Adriatic Sea south of Ancona was in Picenum during the entire early historic period. Between Ancona and Rimini to the north the population was multi-ethnic. In the Roman Republic it was Gallia Togata, but the Gauls were known to have combined or supplanted earlier populations. The ager Gallicus, as it was called, was considered both Gaul and Picenum. Under the Roman Empire the coast south of Rimini was united or reunited with the country south of Ancona as Picenum. By then the only language spoken was Latin.

From Ancona southward a language of the Umbrian group was spoken, today called South Picene. It is attested mainly in inscriptions. Umbrian was an  North of Ancona around Pesaro a non-Italic language, written in a version of the Old Italic script, is attested by four inscriptions (three of which are very brief); this has been termed, for convenience, North Picene. Both the meaning of the inscriptions and the relationship of North Picene to other languages remain unknown. There is phonological evidence that it was linked more closely to the Indo-European language family (than to, for example, Etruscan).  Some authors have referred to North Picene as simply "Picene" – under a hypothesis that it represents the original language across Picenum, although there is as yet no evidence for this.

Ethnonym

One endonym of the Picentes, or at least the South Picenes, may be Pupeneis or, according to Edward Togo Salmon "something similar", as this apparently ethnic name is used in four South Picenian language inscriptions found near Ascoli Piceno. Later refinements of the argument connected it to the Latin name Poponius, as in inscription TE 1 found near Teramo:
apaes ...púpúnis nir
"Appaes ... a Poponian man"
The connection between Poponian and Picentes, if any, remains obscure.

There is no mention in ancient sources of the endonym used by the North Picenes.

The first document to mention the Latin exonym Picentes is the Fasti triumphales, which record for 268/267 BC a triumph given to Publius Sempronius Sophus for a victory de Peicentibus, "over the Picentes," where the -ei- is an Old Latin form. The entire group of Latin Picene words delivered subsequently appear to follow the standard rules for Latin word formation. The root is Pīc-, provenience and meaning yet unknown. The extended Pīc-ēn- is used to form a second-declension adjective, appearing in such phrases as Pīcēnus ager, "Picene country," Pīcēnae olivae, "Picene olives", and the neuter used as a noun, Pīcēnum. These are not references to any people, *Pīcēni, but to the country. Pīcēni where it occurs is the genitive case of Pīcēnum and not a nominative plural; that is "of Picenum" and not "the Piceni." Similarly 
Pīcēnus used alone implies Pīcēnus ager, the "Picene (country)" and does not mean one resident of Picenum. This adjective is never used of the people.

For the people, a third-declension adjective stem is formed: Pīc-ent-, used in Pīcens and Pīcentes, "a Picentine" and "the Picentines," which are nouns formed from the adjective. This adjective can be used of people or of other words, as well as in a second formation of the name of the country, Pīcentum. From it comes a final name of the people, Pīcentini. The historical order in which these words appeared or whether they came from each other remains unknown.

Mythology regarding the origins of the Picentes

According to Strabo, the Picentini  were Sabine colonists, although this is doubted by more recent scholars, who see the South Picenes at least as more closely related to the Sabellians.

Strabo also relates a legend that a woodpecker led the way to Picenum for the people who became the Picentini and apparently a folk etymology of their ethnonym was "those of the woodpecker." Strabo likewise reported myths that other regions of Italy were colonized by people relying on the divinely-inspired guidance of a ritually selected animal: a bull for the Sabines and a wolf for the Hirpini i.e. "those of the wolf" or hirpo. The woodpecker clearly played a part in Picene religion and culture, which strengthens the case for the animal being the source of their endonym. Modern advocates of the theory include: Joshua Whatmough (influenced by James George Frazer), believed that many Italic peoples had tribal totems. According to Whatmough, Italia was thought to mean "land of calves", while wolves were esteemed in varying ways by several peoples, including the Hirpini, Romans and Lucani (whose name was apparently derived from a root such as  *luco- "wolf".)

History
In 299 BC the Romans captured Nequinum, a city of the Umbrians, colonized it and renamed it Narni (after the River Nar). They also concluded a treaty with a people Livy calls the Picentes (the term used is cum Picenti populo, "with the Picentine people"). In 297 BC the Picentes warned the Roman Senate that they had been approached by the Samnites asking for alliance in renewed hostilities with Rome. The Senate thanked them.

After a gap in the record of nearly 30 years the Picentes appear again in a totally different relationship with Rome. The Ager Gallicus on the northeast coast of Italy had for some time been populated by different ethnic groups, mainly Picentes, Etruscans and Gauls. Ancona had been placed there by the Greeks of Sicily; north of it the Gauls predominated. In 283 BC after a series of victories over the Gauls, including the Battle of Lake Vadimon, the Romans expelled the Gallic Senones from the coastal region and annexed it down to Ancona, after which it became "Gallia Togata." In 268 BC the Picentes were defeated in Gallia Togata by two consular armies. Evidently they had rebelled against Rome, probably in 269.

Ancona and Asculum remained independent but the rest of Picenum was annexed. The Romans placed two more colonies to hold it: Ariminum in 268 and Firmum in 264. Between these years they moved large numbers of Picentes to Campania, giving them land at Paestum and on the river Silarus and assisted them to build a city, Picentia. They also placed a garrison at Salernum to monitor them. Strabo reports that in his time they had depopulated the city in favor of villages scattered about the Salerno region. In Ptolemy's time (2nd century AD) a population named by him the Picentini were still at Salernum and Surentum.

Picentes were divided during the Social War (91–87 BC), with some fighting against Rome for the Roman citizenship and others remaining loyal. All Picentes were granted full Roman citizenship after the war.

Genetics
A 2017 analysis of maternal haplogroups from ancient and modern samples indicated a substantial genetic similarity among the modern inhabitants of Central Italy and the area's ancient pre-Roman inhabitants of settlement of Novilara in the province of Pesaro, and evidence of substantial genetic continuity in the region from pre-Roman times to the present with regard to mitochondrial DNA.

Prominent Picentes

Gentes of Picentine origin 
 Afrania gens
 Annia gens
 Nasidiena (gens)
 Pasidiena gens
 Pilia (gens)
 Saturia gens

See also
Picenum
North Picene language
South Picene language
Ancient peoples of Italy

Notes

 
Ancient Italic peoples
Socii
Ancient Abruzzo
History of le Marche